Jacques Goudchaux (born 21 August 1963) is a French former racing driver.

References

1963 births
Living people
French racing drivers
International Formula 3000 drivers
24 Hours of Le Mans drivers
Place of birth missing (living people)

TOM'S drivers